Émile Berlia (23 May 1878 – 13 August 1946) was a French politician.

Berlia was born in Toulouse.  As a young man, he joined the French Section of the Workers' International (SFIO). An associate of Albert Bedouce, he was a member of the Chamber of Deputies from 1933 to 1940. In 1945, having been excluded from the SFIO, he joined the newly founded Democratic Socialist Party (PSD).

References

1878 births
1946 deaths
Politicians from Toulouse
French Section of the Workers' International politicians
Democratic Socialist Party (France) politicians
Members of the 15th Chamber of Deputies of the French Third Republic
Members of the 16th Chamber of Deputies of the French Third Republic